Space propaganda is communication about achievements in space science and technology, used primarily to influence a targeted audience and further a particular political agenda. Space propaganda was heavily relied upon during the Cold War and its use continues to this day.

During the Cold War, both the United States and the Soviet Union were in an ideological battle, and used political warfare to convince "Third World" nations that each side was superior. This was considered most easily done through demonstrations of military and technological superiority. As former allies in World War II, both sides inherited German rocket technology, which they leveraged into intercontinental ballistic missile defenses and the beginning of development of spaceflight capability. These quick technological advances created a suitable environment for the development of space propaganda.

Examples
Many forms of space propaganda have been used by public and government officials to influence space policy. Due to the fact that very few people have been to space, propaganda often relied on artistic depictions and imagery to convey its messages.

Art
Space art, in its crudest form, has existed for thousands of years. One of the earliest forms of modern space art was from the Jules Verne novel From the Earth to the Moon. Over time, with new discoveries and accomplishments in space technology, space art has developed into its own genre of art. Jules Verne's novel and others like it captured the imagination of people.

One of the most famous space paintings was "First Look" by Mitchell Jamieson. This piece was commissioned by NASA, and it shows an astronaut's expression as he looks into space for the first time. Another famous painting by Jamieson was called "First Steps" and depicts astronaut Gordon Cooper leaving his Mercury capsule. These paintings, as well as others, aim to give viewers a representation of what the feeling of exploring outer space may be like and demonstrate the accomplishment and pride of the American space program.

Another piece commissioned by NASA was "The New Olympus" by Alden Wicks. This painting shows the Vehicle Assembly Building at Cape Canaveral Florida, which would be a "suitable temple for the new race of gods."

Posters
The Soviet Union and the United States issued several propaganda posters to promote their national space programs, and incite emotional reactions from the public.

Stamps
One of the ways in which national governments recognize influential figures is through commemorative postage stamps. Usually these stamps are issued for a limited time.  In the United Kingdom, stamps are also printed with Space achievements.

"Royal Mail celebrates Britain's contribution to space exploration with its latest set of commemorative stamps. Due to be issued on 16 October, the six stamps all feature images from European Space Agency missions. From skimming Saturn's rings to keeping a watchful eye on the sun, from visiting our neighboring worlds to flying by the "failed planet" of asteroid Lutetia, Britain now performs most of its space exploration through European Space Agency (ESA). This year marks the 50th anniversary of Britain's space exploration effort. On 26 April 1962, its first satellite, Ariel 1, was launched by NASA. It carried scientific experiments designed by British universities and turned Britain into the world's third space-faring nation, after Russia and America."

Books
Prior to the launch of Sputnik, many Russians were avid science fiction readers. Among them was the son of Soviet Premier Nikita Khrushchev, Dr. Sergei Khrushchev. "We were more perplexed that the satellite had not been launched sooner."

Radio
A radio show, the Space Show, offers “educational” information about topics dealing with aerospace, space policy, astrophysics and more. The program is broadcast from California and licensed by the One Giant Leap Foundation. The program is hosted by Dr. David M. Livingston, whom syndicated radio host, John Batchelor of the John Batchelor Program, refers to as “Dr. Space”. The show is very careful not to be misunderstood or misrepresented and states on the website, "Remember, The Space Show does not endorse or support guest projects, ventures, or business plans. Listeners must rely upon their own judgment and discernment regarding guest comments. The Space Show is not responsible for guest or listener comments, their ventures, or projects. The Space Show is an educational program.
The Space Show now includes 60 second space science and news announcements from Earth and Sky. On archived programs, these announcements can be found at the end of the program. Soon, they will be part of the commercial breaks on the show."

Music
In 1973, the music group Electric Light Orchestra (ELO) dedicated one of its most popular songs "Don't Bring Me Down" to the U.S. space station Skylab.

Films
Films have been used to educate or indoctrinate citizens through informative or dramatic portrayals of ventures into space.

One of the most effective educational films about the space race was The Right Stuff. This film showed the history behind the Mercury Seven astronauts and it helped to give the public a better idea of who these men were and what it took to become an astronaut.

However, in 1986, the movie Space Camp was released. It did poorly in the box office, mainly because it was released five months after the Space Shuttle Challenger disaster, and was seen to be bad taste to continue with its release.

 In 1998 HBO released a television miniseries, From the Earth to the Moon. This was hosted by Tom Hanks whose role in the film Apollo 13 assisted in the success of the series. The series, as explained by Hanks, was to give the viewer an accurate as possible view to the many episodes of the space race.

In 2008 NASA worked with the Discovery Channel, and put together a documentary series entitled When We Left Earth. The documentary used footage of the space race along with interviews from the people who worked on the project. It was also narrated by Gary Sinese, who also played in the Apollo 13 film. The release also coincided with a Presidential campaign in which one of the topics was the next steps of the American space program.

Even though Star Wars was not created as a propaganda film and was created as a science fiction space opera, there are references to the Cold War within the film. At one point during the commentary for Return of the Jedi, George Lucas commented that he wanted the arrival of the Emperor to the Death Star to look intimidating and fearful, "...to look like May Day in Russia."

Several of the James Bond film series: Dr. No, You Only Live Twice, Moonraker, Diamonds Are Forever, GoldenEye, Tomorrow Never Dies, Die Another Day, and Quantum of Solace touch on themes of space exploration. According to John Cork, author of James Bond Legacy, "James Bond was the first hero of the space age.... The Mercury 7 astronauts were being trained right as Dr. No was coming out." The plot of the first Bond film, Dr. No, is about how the villain Dr. No attempts to disrupt the Mercury program. In the film You Only Live Twice, astronauts are held captive in an attempt to initiate World War III. The opening scene of the film depicts astronauts getting killed in space. Satellite weapons and Moon vehicles are depicted in Diamonds Are Forever. Bond becomes the astronaut himself in Moonraker. According to Cork, "They deal with the ideas of manipulation of satellites. They really are dealing with the way the space program works now: We're sending up incredible sophisticated satellites.... Ian Fleming was fascinated by rocketry and space. He even communicated with Arthur C. Clarke."

Public speeches

U.S. President John F. Kennedy
President John F. Kennedy gave a speech arguing for a United States space program. On September 12, 1962, President Kennedy said,

This speech is considered influential in the creation of the Apollo Program.

U.S. President George W. Bush
After the destruction of the Columbia Shuttle in 2003, the Bush Administration tried to reinvigorate NASA with the Constellation Program. The program aimed to build a heavy-lift rocket similar to the Saturn V and establish a Moon base to aid in future missions. President Bush stated, “Today I announce a new plan to explore space and extend a human presence across our solar system. We will begin the effort quickly, using existing programs and personnel. We'll make steady progress -- one mission, one voyage, one landing at a time.” The plan called for a new rocket to be in place and usable in 2015, return to the Moon by 2017 and start a permanent lunar base by 2020.

U.S. President Barack Obama
“The bottom line is nobody is more committed to manned space flight, to human exploration of space than I am."

Private sector
The One Giant Leap Foundation is an organization that promotes the peaceful commercialization of space. Below is a direct quotation of its mission statement,

The Space Foundation also recognizes the history associated with space discoveries and advancements and emphasizes the peaceful use of space. Their website states,

Examples used during the Cold War
The successful launch of Sputnik in 1957 undermined the belief of American technological superiority. This event showed that the Soviets were ahead of the Americans. This Soviet achievement put pressure on U.S. President Dwight D. Eisenhower and was looked on by many as his greatest failure. According to McDougall, "The concomitant arrival of Sputnik and the Third World generalized the problem of the American image. The Soviet challenge and European colonial heritage made it vital for the United States to present and image of progressive anticolonialism."
In the Soviet Union, being the first to reach space was seen as a great victory. Yuri Gagarin's 1961 flight into space was seen by many as another Sputnik moment. Khrushchev stated that Gagarin's flight was the "...greatest triumph of the immortal Lenin's ideas." Egypt's President Nasser stated the "gigantic scientific capabilities of the Soviet people and had no doubt that the launching of man into space will turn upside down not only many scientific views, but also many political and military trends". American newspapers characterized Soviet advancement as: "a psychological victory of the first magnitude"; "new evidence of Soviet superiority"; "cost the nation heavily in prestige"; "marred the political and psychological image of the country abroad"; "Neutral nations may come to believe the wave of the future is Russian."

Gherman Titov's flight into space was seen as a major accomplishment not only for the Soviet Union as a whole but the Premier himself and was boasted about in Pravda which stated that the Premier, "directs the development of the major technical projects in the country, and determines the basic directions of planned growth in cosmic science and technology. In his able proposals there is evidence again and again of his great conviction in the triumph of Soviet rocket technology." Khrushchev felt pressure to put money into missiles and space technology but diverted much of it towards self-serving political objectives.
Another Soviet first was the flight of Valentina Tereshkova, the first woman in space. This was used as a major propaganda theme when she returned in time for the International Congress of Women. It was a symbol of the Soviet woman. Tereshkova went on a world tour as proof of the equality of the sexes in the Soviet Union and the "ever-growing superiority of the socialist order of society over capitalism altogether".
When the Soviet Union launched Voskhod 1, the first spacecraft to carry 3 people, Pravda's headline read, "Sorry Apollo!". The article continued by saying, "...the so-called system of free enterprise is turning out to be powerless in competition with socialism such a complex and modern area as space research."

"If the newspapers printed a despach that the Soviet Union planned sending the first man to Hell, our federal agencies would appear the next day, crying, "We can't let them beat us to it!" --- Hyman Rickover, 1959

When John F. Kennedy became President of the United States there was a question about how to catch up with the Soviet Union. Kennedy did not want to "... place safety about the desire to gain some additional prestige". However, there pressure was there from Congress when Overton Brooks, who was the Chairman of the House Space Committee said, "any step-up in the space program must be designed to accelerate a civilian program of peaceful space exploration and use....This very important from the standpoint of international relations." James E. Webb had a meeting with President Kennedy to help convince him the need to spend resources in the area of space. In this meeting he stated, "...it will be possible through new technology to bring about a whole new areas of international cooperation in meteorology and communications...The extent to which we are leaders in space science and technology will in large measure determine the extent to which we, as a nation, pioneering on a new frontier, will be in a position to develop the emerging world forces and make it the basis for new concepts and application in education, communications, and transportation, looking towards more viable political, social, and economic systems for nations willing to work with us in the years ahead." President Kennedy saw the benefits of the space program as both domestic and international. Kennedy had had a string a failures from Laos to the Congo, the Bay of Pigs Invasion and Gagarin. Vice President Lyndon Johnson was put in charge of America's objectives in space. In a report to President Kennedy he stated, "The Soviets led the United States in prestige; the United States had failed to marshal its superior technological resources; the United States should recognize that countries tend to line up with the country they believe to be the leader; if the United States did not act, the Soviet "margin of control" would get beyond our ability to catch up; even in areas where the Soviets led, the United States had to make aggressive efforts; manned exploration of the Moon was a great propaganda value but was essential whether or not the United States was first." Further on in the meeting Johnson stated, "One can predict with confidence that failure to master space means being second best in the crucial arena of our Cold War world. In the eyes of the world, first in space means first period; second in space is second in everything."

On July 20, 1969 the United States landed on the Moon. This was seen as an American victory in space. The plaque that was left on the base of the lander states that "We came in peace for all mankind".

Yuri Gagarin

Yuri Gagarin was the first man in space. This was a monumental event not only in Soviet history but also world history. It was therefore only natural that a cult of personality developed around the man who was the first in space. His achievement made him and instant celebrity and international hero. The story of Yuri Gagarin made his hero status even more deserving. He was from a common background. His wife recalled a story about a time he was thrown out of a house and had to live in a dugout of a garden for three years during the German occupation of the Soviet Union.  Gagarin had a thirst for knowledge which inspired people to study hard. Also Gagarin was known to have a warm and charming personality with a wonderful sense of humor. As his popularity soared, it also became threatening. President Kennedy did not let Yuri Gagarin tour the United States because he was so popular. The end of his life was seen as such a tragedy that it only added to his popularity. Yuri Gagarin's story was told to millions of people throughout the world. Books, magazines, TV shows, movies have all been created to honor this man. Posters and stamps were issued with Yuri's face on it. April 12 is known as the Day of Space in Russia to commemorate Yuri Gagarin's flight.

John Glenn

In the United States, John Glenn is held in high honors. Being the first American to orbit the Earth was seen as a great American accomplishment. It was an important step to catching up with the Soviet Union during the Space Race. Glenn, in addition to becoming a successful astronaut, also became a successful politician. He successfully ran for the United States Senate. Later on, NASA honored his flight into space with a website that takes the viewer through John Glenn's Mission of Freedom 7. The United States Post Office issued a commemorative stamp. There are also schools named after John Glenn.

Valentina Tereshkova

The USSR launched the first woman (also the first civilian), Valentina Tereshkova, into space on Vostok 6; this was a propaganda stunt rather than a good faith step for women's equality, and possibly a medical experiment. Prior to flying on Vostok 6, Tereshkova worked in a textile factory and was an amateur parachutist. After Gagarin's flight, Nikolai Kamanin, director of cosmonaut training, read in American media about the "Mercury 13", female pilots trying to become astronauts. Although this article noted that the women passed the same medical qualification tests as the male candidates, it must not have mentioned that they were not accepted or trained as astronauts by NASA, and thus had absolutely no chance of being accepted into the all-male test pilot-astronaut community. In his diary, Kamanin wrote, "We cannot allow that the first woman in space will be American. This would be an insult to the patriotic feelings of Soviet women." He got permission to choose a small corps of female cosmonauts; Tereshkova was the only one of five women amateur parachutists to fly.

Although she had to join the Soviet Air Forces to become a cosmonaut, Soviet male test pilots of the 1960s were no more accepting of women in their ranks than their American counterparts, though the Soviet Air Force had three segregated all-women combat air regiments in World War II. On November 3, 1963, Tereshkova married Vostok 3 cosmonaut Andriyan Nikolayev, and they had a daughter, Elena Andrianovna Nikolaeva-Tereshkova, the first person with both a mother and father who had traveled into space.

Kamanin wanted to fly more women on the last two Voskhod flights, but the cancellation of these flights in 1965 put an end to this. The USSR didn't again open its cosmonaut corps to women until 1980, two years after the United States opened its astronaut corps to women.

The term "space race"
Politicians and journalists will use the phrase space race to stimulate controversy, interest, or competition. The term was used during the Cold War to describe the competition between the US and the USSR. Today the phrase is used by journalists frequently to draw attention to competing countries developing technology and access to space. As Time Magazine states, “Space exploration is a powerful rallying point for national pride… The contest may not be accompanied by the blaring cold-war overtones of the last great space race between the U.S. and the Soviet Union. China's space program is conducted largely in secret, and Japan's modest achievements don't make headlines. But plenty is at stake. Over the past few years, a centuries-old rivalry between China and Japan has flared anew. While the two countries are increasingly interdependent economically, relations remain uncomfortably strained as fast-growing China begins to challenge Japan as the preeminent East Asian power. This spring, for example, anti-Japan riots erupted in a number of Chinese cities, and diplomatic disputes over natural-gas-field rights in the East China Sea continue to rage.

Furthermore, journalists also describe how the race can lead to other fearful races. As Kyle Niemeyer discusses in his article Asia’s Space Race Could Turn into an Arms Race, “The major Asian nations, including China, Japan, India, and South Korea, are all expanding their space programs with little-to-no cooperation. These efforts are driven by national prestige and geopolitical rivalries, similar to the US-Soviet space race of the 1960s. Like that period, this space race is stimulating technological advances, but competing agendas are leading to duplication of work and mistrust—in other words, a waste of resources. Even worse, this competition is undermining recent cooperation between the US, Russia, and Europe."

Another Time magazine article titled "Sino-Japanese Space Race", states, “With Asia's biggest powers set to launch their first unmanned lunar missions — possibly as early as next month — the countdown has begun in the hottest space race since the United States beat the Soviet Union to the Moon nearly four decades ago."

Examples used in Europe
Europeans are also proud of their contributions to space. As Brid-Aine Parnell points out in her piece for The A Register, "The government is fond of bandying about the idea that the UK space sector already generates £9bn a year, but in fact this is a completely made-up figure concocted by counting Sky TV and a few other "downstream space" companies as though they were satellite makers or something. Chancellor George Osborne said that the increased spending on ESA would bring substantial benefits to the UK adding that the private sector had already identified projects worth up to £1bn that “will flow” from the investment. Clearly, the expectation is that more contracts will come Britain's way if it ups its investment in ESA at a time when other European countries are finding the spare change to fund their existing obligations."

Examples used by the People's Republic of China
The People's Republic of China have also used their accomplishment in space as a form of internal and external propaganda. The word rocket itself means firing arrow. The concept of rocketry was first developed in China during the 3rd century A.D. Modern Chinese advancement are given credit to Tsien Hsue Shen. In 2012 China released a film honoring the 100th anniversary of his birthday. Chinese Communist Party general secretary Hu Jintao opened a library commemorating his birth.
The Cultural Revolution in China affected the space program and there were competing for attention. “Subsequent histories recorded that the revolutionaries spread the slogan that “when the satellite goes up, the red flag goes down’ and urged concentration on the political rather than the scientific. However once the Chinese had accomplished a successful satellite launch the official announcement was, “We did it through our own unaided efforts” despite the fact that several Russian scientist had assisted with the program up until the Sino-Soviet split. The Chinese treated the successful launch as one of the greatest events of the century, which included nationwide parades and celebrations. The satellite itself broadcast “the east is Red” 

Even though the United States landed on the Moon in 1969, there is no more space race, and the Soviet Union no longer exists, there are still forms of space propaganda. The most widely used of which can be found in the People's Republic of China. The Chinese space program began in the 1960s but it was not internationally recognized until the launching of Shenzhou V, which put China's first astronaut into space. The Chinese had successfully launched a satellite in the 1970s. There was a pause in the Chinese program for a couple decades, but was picked up again and restarted as a way for the party to instill confidence and patriotism. With the rise of its space program it is now considered a modern country that can stand with the west. Col. Yang Liwei became an instant celebrity in China. Millions of stamps were issued with his face on them to show this great accomplishment.

TV commercials in China since 2003 have shown an astronaut walking on the Moon demonstrating the ultimate goal of the Chinese program. Space images in China have been used as a manner of inspiration, but also to bring people under control. It is believed that in the near term China will start using female astronauts to demonstrate further successes with the space program.

China is also using space based missile technology as propaganda. China has developed and tested an anti-satellite weapon. Despite the fact that China has pledged to ban space based weapons, this demonstration to the world proved that they have developed them and could use them if need be.

References

Bibliography

External links 
   Whitey on the Moon
 www.arts.gov
 Chinese Propaganda Posters Chineseposters.net
 Russian Propaganda Space Song Honoring Yuri Gagarin
 Space.com article about movies for Yuri Gagarin
 Chinese Use America the Beautiful for Space Launch
 Woody Woodpecker in Space
 Woody Woodpecker in Space II
 North Korean Space Propaganda Video
 SPACE Propaganda

Space policy
Propaganda by topic